The Pennsylvania State Game Lands Number 49 are Pennsylvania State Game Lands in Bedford and Fulton Counties in Pennsylvania in the United States providing hunting, bird watching, and other activities.

Geography
SGL 49 consists of five parcels located in Mann and Monroe Townships in Bedford County and Union Township in Fulton County near the villages of Amaranth, Barnes Gap, Buck Valley, Inglesmith, Lashley, Purcell, Robinsonville, Silver Mills. The Game Lands lie within the Potomac River watershed. Interstate 70 runs northeast of the Game Lands, Pennsylvania Route 484 is to the southeast, Pennsylvania Route 26 is to the southwest. Pennsylvania State Game Lands Number 65 is just a couple of miles to the east of the upper parcel.

Statistics

Biology
Hunting and furtaking species include white-tailed deer (Odocoileus virginianus), ruffed grouse (Bonasa umbellus), gray squirrel (Sciurus carolinensis), and turkey (Meleagris gallopavo).

See also
 Pennsylvania State Game Lands
 Pennsylvania State Game Lands Number 26, also located in Bedford County
 Pennsylvania State Game Lands Number 41, also located in Bedford County
 Pennsylvania State Game Lands Number 48, also located in Bedford County
 Pennsylvania State Game Lands Number 73, also located in Bedford County
 Pennsylvania State Game Lands Number 97, also located in Bedford County
 Pennsylvania State Game Lands Number 104, also located in Bedford County
 Pennsylvania State Game Lands Number 261, also located in Bedford County

References

049
Protected areas of Bedford County, Pennsylvania
Protected areas of Fulton County, Pennsylvania